Wayback may refer to:

The Waybacks, a 1918 Australian film
The Waybacks, an Americana band based in San Francisco
Wayback Machine,  a digital time capsule and archiving service for Internet resources created by the Internet Archive
WABAC machine (pronounced wayback), a fictional machine from Peabody's Improbable History, an ongoing feature of the cartoon The Rocky and Bullwinkle Show

See also
 Way Back (disambiguation)